Michael Connor Gainey (born January 18, 1948) is an American character actor best known for his appearances in Lost, Con Air, Sideways, Tangled, and Django Unchained.

Early life
Gainey was born in Jackson, Mississippi. In the early 1970s, he attended the American Conservatory Theater in San Francisco, California, with Ken Hixon. Prior to this, he attended the University of Southern Mississippi. He worked as a mortician's apprentice before he decided to study acting.
He served in the U.S. Army and was the company mailman at his post in Chakmakli, Turkey in 1969.

Career
In 1981, he made his big-screen debut in Herbert Ross's musical Pennies from Heaven starring Steve Martin and Bernadette Peters. Since the early 1980s, he has been in over 50 films, including Two Idiots in Hollywood (1988), The Mighty Ducks (1992), The Fan (1996), Breakdown (1997), Con Air (1997), Terminator 3: Rise of the Machines (2003), Sideways (2004), Are We There Yet? (2005), The Dukes of Hazzard (2005), Wild Hogs (2007) and Mr. Woodcock (2007).

Gainey was one of the stars of the short-lived series Against the Law and played Tom Friendly on the series Lost. He also played murderous drug dealer Bo Crowder in season one on the hit FX series Justified. He has guest starred on over 40 television shows, including The Dukes of Hazzard, Knight Rider, Designing Women, The Adventures of Brisco County, Jr., Walker, Texas Ranger, Criminal Minds, CSI, Girl Meets World, Cheers, Days of Our Lives, The X-Files, Desperate Housewives, The Mentalist, Burn Notice, and The Fresh Prince of Bel-Air.

In 2003, Gainey appeared in The Last Cowboy, playing the role of Lance Henriksen's friend, along with Bradley Cooper and Jennie Garth. In 2004, Gainey appeared as a cuckolded husband in full frontal nudity in the award-winning arthouse film Sideways. He played Kurtz / The Wizard in the controversial road-revenge short film Apocalypse Oz. In 2007, he appeared in Mr. Woodcock, Wild Hogs, and Unearthed. In 2010, he appeared in Love Ranch and voiced the Captain of the Palace Guard in Tangled and he reprised this role for the TV series Rapunzel's Tangled Adventure in 2017-2020. In 2012, he appeared in Quentin Tarantino's film Django Unchained.

Personal life

He has been married to his wife Kim Novicki since 2002.

On being typecast, Gainey stated:

On his favorite of the villainous characters he has played, Gainey said:

Film

Television

Video games

References

External links

 

1948 births
Living people
American male film actors
American male television actors
Male actors from Mississippi
Actors from Jackson, Mississippi
University of Southern Mississippi alumni